Senator Hitchcock may refer to:

Members of the United States Senate
Gilbert Hitchcock (1859–F1934), U.S. Senator from Nebraska from 1911 to 1923
Herbert E. Hitchcock (1867–1958), U.S. Senator from South Dakota from 1936 to 1938
Phineas Hitchcock (1831–1881), U.S. Senator from Nebraska from 1871 to 1877

United States state senate members
Peter Hitchcock (1781–1853), Ohio State Senate
Simon C. Hitchcock (1800s–1878), New York State Senate